Karomama (also rendered Karamama, Karomat, Karoma, Karoama, Kamama) is a name for several women from Ancient Egypt most dating to the Twenty-second Dynasty of Egypt:

 Karomama A, wife of Shoshenq I, mother of Osorkon I
 Karomama (queen) B, King's Wife, King's Daughter, Mistress of Upper and Lower Egypt. Daughter of Takelot I, wife of Osorkon II
 Karomama C, King's Daughter of His Body, Daughter of Osorkon II and Karomama B, who may be the same as Karomama Meritmut
 Karomama Meritmut, Karomama G Merytmut I, God's Wife of Amun, Lady of the Two Lands, Adoratrix. Possibly identical with Karomama C
 Karomama II (Karomama D Merytmut II), Great Royal Wife, Mistress of Upper and Lower Egypt. Daughter of Nimlot C and Tentsepeh. Wife of Takelot II
 Karomama E, Chantress of Amun, daughter of Takelot II

Ancient Egyptian given names